Abeken is a surname. Notable people with the surname include:

Bernhard Rudolf Abeken (1780–1866), German philologist and literature historian
Heinrich Abeken (1809–1872), German theologian and Prussian diplomat
Hermann Abeken (1820–1854), German political writer and statistician
Wilhelm Ludwig Abeken (1813–1843), German archaeologist